The fourth season of the Sgt. Frog anime series consists of the fifty-one episodes after episode one-hundred-and-fifty-four from the series, which first aired in Japan from April 7, 2007 to March 29, 2008 on TV Tokyo. Season 4 uses 5 songs: 2 Openings and 3 Endings.  by Ichirō Zaitsu & Yuko Ogura is used as the opening from episode 155 to 183.  by Dylan & Catherine is used as the opening from episode 184 to 205.  by Kigurumi is used as the ending from episode 155 to 168.  by Non Style is used as the ending from episode 169 to 192.  by Osamu Minagawa & Hibari Children Chorus is used as the ending from episode 193 to 205.


Episode list

References

External links
  4th season episodes
  Keroro Gunsō schedule - Sunrise

2007 Japanese television seasons
2008 Japanese television seasons
Season 4